Lunar Eclipse is a 1999 Chinese film and the directorial debut from Sixth Generation director Wang Quan'an. It is also the feature film debut of Wang's most frequent collaborator/muse Yu Nan. Unlike his next two films, which focus on rural communities, Lunar Eclipse is an urban drama following the wife of a newlywed couple (Yu Nan) who becomes mesmerized by an amateur photographer (Wu Chao) who claims to have once been in love with a woman who looked just like her. The film was produced by the Beijing Film Studio.

With its themes of dual female identities, the film is often referenced in conjunction with Lou Ye's Suzhou River.

Cast
 Yu Nan as Ya Nan, a young bride
 Hu Xiaoguang as Guohao, Ya Nan's husband is Ying Yan Xiang
 Wu Chao as Xiaobing, a minivan driver and amateur photographer

Reception

Awards and nominations 
 2000 22nd Moscow International Film Festival - Lunar Eclipse was in competition for the festival's top prize, the Golden St. George, though it failed to win. It did, however, win the FIPRESCI Prize.
 2001 Deauville Asian Film Festival - Lunar Eclipse won a prize for Best Actress for Yu Nan's performance.

See also 
 Suzhou River, Lou Ye's 2000 film that share similar themes

References

External links 
 
 Lunar Eclipse at the Chinese Movie Database
 Lunar Eclipse at Cinemasie

1999 films
Chinese romantic drama films
1990s Mandarin-language films
Films directed by Wang Quan'an
Beijing Film Studio films
1999 romantic drama films
1999 directorial debut films